Cryptanthus correia-araujoi is a plant species in the genus Cryptanthus. This species is endemic to Brazil.

Cultivars
 Cryptanthus 'Cariacica'
 Cryptanthus 'Imposter Green'

References

BSI Cultivar Registry Retrieved 11 October 2009

correia-araujoi
Flora of Brazil